Pilot ( (Paĭlot) was a Russian icebreaker, the world's first steam-powered and metal-ship icebreaker of modern type.

Pilot had originally been built as a steam-powered propeller tug. It had the bow altered to achieve an ice-clearing capability (20° raise from keel line). Conversion had been done in 1864 under an order of its owner, the local merchant Mikhail Britnev. This allowed Pilot to push itself on the top of the ice and consequently break it. It's said that M.O. Britnev fashioned the bow of his ship after the shape of old wooden Pomor boats (kochs), which had been navigating icy waters of the White Sea and Barents Sea for centuries.

Pilot was used between 1864-1890 for navigation in the Gulf of Finland between Kronstadt and Oranienbaum thus extending the summer navigation season by several weeks. Inspired by the success of Pilot, Mikhail Britnev built a second similar vessel "Boy" ("Battle" in Russian) in 1875 and a third "Booy" ("Buoy" in Russian) in 1889.

The cold winter of 1870–1871 led to the international recognition of Britnev's design. That year the Elbe River and the port of Hamburg froze, which caused a prolonged halt of navigation and huge commercial losses. In such circumstances, Germans purchased Pilot'''s design from Britnev for some 300 rubles. Thus the German Eisbrecher I appeared in 1871, and other European countries soon followed the suit.

With its rounded shape and strong metal hull, Pilot had all the main features present in the modern icebreakers, therefore it is often considered the first true icebreaker. Another contender for this title is icebreaker Yermak, built in England for Russia according to the design of Admiral Stepan Makarov and under his supervision. Makarov borrowed the main principles from Pilot'' and applied them for creation of the first polar icebreaker, which was able to run over and crush pack ice.

Literature

References

Russian inventions
Icebreakers of Russia